Swamp Woman is a 1941 American film directed by Elmer Clifton.

Plot summary 

The movie depicts the journey of three individuals rushing through the vast swamplands. These include honky-tonk dancer Annabelle Tollington, the opportunistic promoter "Flash" Bland, who is after Annabelle, and Jeff Carter, a fugitive trying to evade the police lieutenant's tracking dogs. After escaping the law, Jeff reaches the cabin of Lizbet Tollington, Annabelle's niece, and the fiancée of trapper Pete Oliver, who is Annabelle's former lover. To avoid detection, Lizbet conceals Jeff from the law. Meanwhile, Annabelle informs Pete that Lizbet is sheltering a man in her cabin to break their engagement, which infuriates Pete. However, after realizing Lizbet's love for Jeff, Pete agrees to aid the fugitive. When Rance finally arrives, he identifies Annabelle as the legendary "Swamp Woman".

Cast 
Ann Corio as Annabelle Tollington
Jack La Rue as Pierre Pertinax Pontineau Briand Broussicourt d'Olivier, aka Pete Oliver
Mary Hull as Lizbet Tollington
Ian MacDonald as Det. Lt. Rance
Jay Novello as 'Flash' Brand
Richard Deane as Jeff Carter
Lois Austin as Mary Tollington
Earl Gunn as Jed Tollington
Guy Wilkerson as Abner Enderberry
Jimmy Aubrey as Tod Appleby
Carlin Sturtevant as Granny Grundy
Ernie Adams as Spratt
Frank Hagney as Guard

Soundtrack 
 Ann Corio - "You Surprise Me" (Written by Eddie Cherkose and Jacques Press)

References

External links 

1941 films
1941 drama films
1940s English-language films
Films directed by Elmer Clifton
American black-and-white films
Producers Releasing Corporation films
American drama films
1940s American films
English-language drama films